Northwest Atlantic Marine Alliance (NAMA) is a non-profit organization that aims to restore and enhance an enduring marine system supporting a healthy diversity and an abundance of marine life and human uses through a self-organizing and self-governing organization.

History 
NAMA was founded in 1995 in New England, United States.  A small group of fishermen and fishing community advocates began exploring an alternative management structure, using the decentralized governance model successfully employed by BankAmericard in the 1960s when rebranding as Visa Inc. under the leadership of Dee Hock, VISA's founder and CEO Emeritus.

In 1998, NAMA incorporated as an independent, non-profit organization focused on pursuing community based management to achieve its aims.

Led by Captain Craig Pendleton, Peter Schelley and Jennifer Atkinson of Conservation Law Foundation, Mark Simonitch (commercial fisherman), Rollie Barnaby of University of New Hampshire and other advisors and participants, NAMA set out to perform collaborative research aimed at realizing community and ecosystem-based management.

NAMA advocates for a collaborative process aimed at managing resources on a localized level, and not the entire U.S. eastern seaboard.

See also 
Community supported fishery

References

External links 
NAMA website

Nature conservation organizations based in the United States
Fisheries conservation organizations
Marine conservation organizations
Companies established in 1995
1995 establishments in the United States
Non-profit organizations based in Maine